David Lee Roth (born October 10, 1954) is an American rock singer known for his wild, energetic stage persona. Roth was the original lead vocalist of the hard rock band Van Halen for three stints, from 1974 to 1985, during 1996, and from 2006 to when they disbanded in 2020. He was also known as a successful solo artist, releasing numerous RIAA-certified Gold and Platinum albums. After more than two decades apart, Roth re-joined Van Halen in 2006 for a North American tour that became the highest-grossing in the band's history and one of the highest-grossing of that year. In 2012, Roth and Van Halen released the comeback album A Different Kind of Truth. In 2007, he was inducted into the Rock and Roll Hall of Fame as a member of Van Halen.

Early life
Roth was born in Bloomington, Indiana to an ophthalmologist, Nathan Lee Roth, and a teacher, Sibyl Roth. He has two sisters, one of whom is Lisa Roth, creator of the Rockabye Baby! lullaby music series. The family is of Jewish heritage as well as of Portuguese descent. From an early age, Roth had an interest in art especially film and radio; he said his first music idol was Al Jolson.

For the most part, Roth grew up in New Castle, Indiana. In a 2019 interview with Q95's "Stuck and Gunner" he explained: "My grandparents moved to New Castle in 1913. It's in the sense of humor, the 'get it done' and how we do get it done approach work ethic of Van Halen, frankly. It's a Midwest approach, not some flakey Hollywood horse manure." The Roths also briefly lived in Swampscott, Massachusetts. In his teens, they relocated to Pasadena, California. He attended The Webb Schools in Claremont, California, and John Muir High School in Pasadena. His parents had their son, prone to daily bouts of hyperactivity dubbed "monkey time", see a psychiatrist for three years, as well as attend a horse ranch for troubled teens, to build a sense of responsibility.
While attending Pasadena City College, he met the Van Halen brothers, Eddie and Alex. During this period Roth worked as a hospital orderly.

First run with Van Halen: 1972–1984

In his late teens, Roth was singing solo, as well as with an R&B tinged rock group called the Red Ball Jets. Roth says the name was in reference to the red dye used in food at that time, including red candy balls, which would exacerbate his hyperactivity and lead to "monkey hour" at the family home. (Red Ball Jets was also the name of a brand of sneakers popular from 1951 to 1971.) Another Los Angeles group, Mammoth (featuring Alex Van Halen on drums and Eddie Van Halen singing and playing lead guitar), occasionally rented the Red Ball Jets' PA system for $10/night. After a couple of failed auditions, Roth joined Mammoth as lead singer. In 1974, Mammoth officially changed its name to Van Halen. According to Roth, this was his brainchild. He felt it was a moniker that offered long-term identity, aesthetic, and marketing advantages, like Santana.

Performing original and cover songs, Van Halen eventually gained success in the Pasadena, West Hollywood, and Los Angeles areas, becoming a regular feature on Sunset Strip clubs, like Gazzarri's, Myron's, Whisky a Go Go, and the Starwood Club. In 1976, Gene Simmons took note of the band (in particular Eddie Van Halen, whom Simmons hoped to recruit for his own band, KISS) and assisted them in producing a 29-track demo tape, featuring many of the songs that would be included on their first three LPs, the tape garnered little major label interest. In early 1977, however, during their four-month stint at The Starwood, Warner Bros executive Mo Ostin and producer Ted Templeman signed them to an inauspicious two-album contract, one that heavily favored Warner Bros., offering but a .70 per unit royalty. Manager Noel Monk, then an equal partner in band revenue, renegotiated this rate for double in 1979.

Released in 1978, the debut album Van Halen was recorded at Sunset Sound Recorders and immediately earned the band significant national attention and radio airplay. They toured for 3 months at the bottom of the bill supporting rising superstars Journey and the now flailing Montrose, then another nine months opening for hard rock icons Black Sabbath, stealing the show every night on both tours. The album reached number 19 on the Billboard 200 and eventually sold more than 12 million copies by 2014, certified Diamond by the RIAA.

The original Van Halen recorded four more platinum albums over the next five years, often within 12 to 14 days and immediately returning to the road to tour. Roth is often credited with promoting Van Halen's image, described by David Fricke in Rolling Stone as "a nonstop booze-and-babes party train." Yet despite this 'wildman' image, Roth was key to the band's success not just as a high kicking, tight pantsed, Capezio-wearing singer and lyricist, but as the de facto chairman of the board in band decisions of business, marketing and publicity, according to Monk. Roth's sexy, macho but poetic, often jovial lyrics worked in perfect harmony with the hard rock guitar sounds composed by Eddie Van Halen; a sound-style that helped the band rise to the top of the Billboard pop chart in 1984, with their quintessential album 1984, their first and only #1 LP. Looking back at Roth's tenure, Fricke dubbed Van Halen as "the monster rock action squad that ruled the charts and the airwaves for seven years." "I remember hearing about this new band, Van Halen with David Lee Roth," recalled Aerosmith front-man Steven Tyler. "'Who does this fucking guy think he is? He's standing in my limelight.' I'd fucked myself up royally."

Despite the band's seven-year financial and artistic success, a creative rift developed between Roth and Eddie Van Halen early on. Roth was interested in popularity via original or even cover songs about partying, dancing, women and sex, along the lines of Aerosmith, AC/DC or even disco, while Ed wanted darker, deeper tunes in minor keys, like those on their 4th LP Fair Warning. They had been perfect artistic foils on the first three albums, but their fifth LP, Diver Down, saw a very disgruntled Edward "sacrificing" his original synthesizer and guitar riffs to five cover songs, three of which became singles: Dancing in the Street, Where Have All the Good Times Gone and Oh, Pretty Woman.
In 1983, Eddie designed and constructed a state-of-the-art recording studio in his home with the band's long-time recording engineer, Don Landee. This led to creative conflict, as it allowed Ed to dominate the recording process without so much input from Roth. Furthermore, he began to experiment in an almost New Wave direction with keyboards and synthesizers, while Roth preferred guitar-heavy hard rock. 
Their sixth and final album together until 2006, 1984, was a critical and commercial success and continued the band's move toward mainstream pop.

However in early 1985, while still a member of Van Halen, Roth released Crazy from the Heat, an eclectic solo EP of off-beat pop standards. Some months before Roth's departure, Noel Monk, their manager of seven years was fired suddenly by the Van Halen brothers; he speculated that (Roth) was testing the waters for a potential separate, solo career.

According to Monk, Roth formally parted ways with his Van Halen bandmates in August 1985 (although an urban legend persists that it was April 1, April Fool's Day), taking with him 60 Van Halen employees, including VH Head of Security, Ed Andersen. In his 1998 autobiography, Crazy from the Heat, a bitter Roth characterized Van Halen's music just before his 1985 departure as "morose".

1996 reunion
In June 1996, Roth briefly reunited with Van Halen, to great public fanfare. He recorded two new songs for Van Halen's Best Of – Volume I, "Can't Get This Stuff No More" and "Me Wise Magic". After an infamous appearance on September 5, 1996, at the MTV Video Music Awards during which Roth and Eddie Van Halen reportedly threatened each other, Roth was passed over for Van Halen's vocalist job in favor of Gary Cherone. In 2012, Cherone confirmed the longtime rumor that he had already been chosen long before the MTV incident, suggesting that Van Halen used Roth to create public interest in the hits collection. "Me Wise Magic", Van Halen's display of psychedelia-influenced rock with Roth on vocals, became a No. 1 Billboard Mainstream Rock hit in 1996.

2001 reunion
In 2001, rumors swirled that Roth and the members of Van Halen had recorded several new songs together and were attempting yet another reunion. Roth and bassist Michael Anthony later confirmed that information, but nothing came of the music. A rumored box set did not materialize. Instead, Warner Bros. issued remastered versions of all six early Van Halen studio albums.

Solo career: 1985–2006

Commercial success: 1985–1991 

In 1984, Roth wished to record a solo EP quickly and shoot a film. "We've created a whole retinue of characters," he noted of his vision with Angelus. "It's a genuine film. It's not 'Dave Singing' or 'Elvis'." Entitled Crazy from the Heat, the EP was released in January 1985, while the film was budgeted at $20 million by CBS Films; however, the project folded after the consolidation of CBS Studios.

In late 1985, now separated from Van Halen, Roth assembled a virtuoso supergroup, consisting of guitarist Steve Vai (previously of Frank Zappa's band), bassist Billy Sheehan (previously of Talas), and drummer Gregg Bissonette (previously of Maynard Ferguson's big band). With veteran Van Halen producer Ted Templeman producing, Roth released his debut solo LP, Eat 'Em and Smile in July 1986. The album saw Roth's return to hard rock music, but incorporated some of his eclectic musical tastes, including a jazz cover of Frank Sinatra's "That's Life" and the bluesy, 1960s hit "Tobacco Road". Eat 'Em and Smile met with widespread commercial and critical success, charting at No. 4 on the Billboard Top 200, selling over 2 million copies in the U.S. alone. Roth and his band toured arenas extensively in support of Eat 'Em and Smile before returning to the studio in 1987 to record a follow-up album.

In January 1988, Roth released Skyscraper, a more experimental LP featuring the hit single "Just Like Paradise". Co-produced by Roth and Steve Vai under the working title "Cliffhanger", Skyscraper peaked at No. 6 on the Billboard album chart and ultimately sold two million copies in the US. Soon after Skyscrapers release, Sheehan left Roth's band due to musical differences. He was replaced in time for the album's support tour with bassist Matt Bissonette, (drummer Gregg Bissonette's brother.) The international Skyscraper Tour arena was a major production featuring, at different points during each concert, Roth surfing above the audience on a surfboard suspended from an arena's rafters, and lowered into the center of each arena in a descending boxing ring. Both parts of the stage show were featured in the "Just Like Paradise" music video. The show also featured the band in a calypso segment playing Caribbean steel drums and in an unplugged segment where the band performed acoustic covers of old rock and roll songs. Following the tour for Skyscraper, Vai left Roth's band to pursue a solo career and record and tour with Whitesnake.

Roth hired 19-year-old guitar virtuoso Jason Becker to replace Vai prior to recording his third solo LP, A Little Ain't Enough in 1991. A hard rock album produced by Bob Rock, A Little Ain't Enough achieved RIAA gold status shortly after its January 1991 release. Before starting a support tour for A Little Ain't Enough, Becker was diagnosed with Lou Gehrig's disease, rendering him unable to perform onstage. Guitarist Joe Holmes stood in for Becker during the tour. Later in 1991, Nirvana and grunge rock emerged, altering popular tastes and suddenly making Roth's brand of hard rock seem unfashionable. Roth's band fractured shortly following the tour's completion.

Commercial decline: 1992–2003 
In April 1993, Roth was arrested in New York City's Washington Square Park for buying what he described as "$10 worth of Jamaican bunk reefer" from an undercover police officer. The arrest made headlines and became a late-night television punch-line. When asked by Howard Stern whether the bust was a publicity stunt, Roth said, "Howard, in New York City this small of a bust is a $35 traffic citation. It literally says 'Buick, Chevy, Other'. Your dog poops on the sidewalk, it's $50. If I was looking for publicity, I would have pooped on the sidewalk."

In March 1994, Roth released Your Filthy Little Mouth, a musically-eclectic album produced by Nile Rodgers. The album failed to achieve significant critical or commercial success, proving to be Roth's first solo effort not to achieve RIAA Gold or Platinum status shortly after its release. Roth played smaller venues in the U.S., and larger venues in Europe on a support tour.

In 1995, Roth returned with an adult lounge act, performing largely in Las Vegas casinos, with a brass band that featured Nile Rodgers, Edgar Winter, and members of the Miami Sound Machine. It also featured several exotic dancers, who in Roth's words were "so sweet, I bet they shit sugar!" In 1997, Roth wrote a well-received, New York Times best-selling memoir, Crazy from the Heat. The 359-page book was a selected collection of 1,200 pages of monologues, which were recorded and transcribed by a Princeton University graduate who followed Roth for almost a year. The book received mostly positive critical and reader reaction.

In 1998, Roth released DLR Band, another album original material. The album featured a popular song, "Slam Dunk", which, like a majority of the album, was co-written by rising guitarist and longtime Roth fan, John 5. The album was considered a return to form for Roth by critics. In 1999, Roth contacted the Songs of Love Foundation asking if he would be able to sing a song for an ailing child. He went on to record a "Song of Love" for 9-year-old Ashley Abernathy who was battling leukemia, which was released publicly many years later. In the late 1990s, Roth became an emergency medical technician (EMT) in New York City, going on over 200 ambulance rides.

In 2002, The "Song for Song: The Heavyweight Champions of Rock and Roll Tour" paired Roth with his 'nemesis' Sammy Hagar, and it proceeded to revive the career of Roth. Despite the monetary success and publicity generated by the tour, Roth's future with Van Halen seemed uncertain. "Yankee Rose" appeared in the 2002 videogame Grand Theft Auto: Vice City, playing on rock station V-Rock, while generally, Roth became more visible than he had been in years, such as appearing on commercials for MTV with Justin Timberlake. In 2003, Roth released an album called Diamond Dave, which included one original John 5 collaboration among numerous cover songs.

Other ventures: 2004–2006 

In 2004, Roth appeared on the TV series The Sopranos as a poker-playing guest of Tony Soprano. Regarding this, Roth was quoted on his website as saying, "Mom says I'm going to look like Lee Marvin in 10 years whether I'm in movies or not, so I might as well get after it!" On July 4, 2004, Roth performed with the world-renowned Boston Pops Orchestra at Boston's annual Pops Goes the Fourth celebration. The performance was witnessed by over 100,000 people live in Boston, and by millions more on US television. In 2006, Roth covered two Van Halen songs for an album titled Strummin' with the Devil, a tribute to his old band in bluegrass style. The album topped out at 66 on the U.S. Billboard country charts. 

In 2006, Roth was tapped to replace his friend Howard Stern on terrestrial radio, following Stern's departure from terrestrial to Sirius Satellite Radio. Roth's show lasted for four months, and ended in a lawsuit. During the course of the show, Roth maintained a relationship with Howard 100 News reporter Steve Langford. Roth and Langford met frequently after shows, with Langford bringing tape back to Stern of Roth's complaints towards WXRK's management. Issues included Roth's firing, the missing podcast, and his show being cut off early. On Roth's final day, April 21, 2006, he performed the Rolling Stones song "You Can't Always Get What You Want" for Stern and discussed an impending lawsuit against CBS.

Later, on October 14, 2012, Roth began broadcasting a video webcast/podcast on his YouTube channel, Spotify and iTunes.

Return to Van Halen: 2007–2015

On January 24, 2007, after much anticipation, Billboard.com reported that Roth would rejoin Van Halen for a 40-date arena and amphitheater tour in mid-2007. This report, among many others, was confirmed with an official press release posted on the official Van Halen website on February 2, 2007.

On February 2, 2007, the Official Van Halen Web Site released information that Roth had rejoined the band along with current members Alex, Eddie, and Valerie Bertinelli's teenage son, Wolfgang Van Halen. On March 8 the official Van Halen website posted a letter from Eddie Van Halen stating that he did not feel he could perform his absolute best, and the tour with Roth would be postponed.

In March 2007 five members of Van Halen, the four original members and Sammy Hagar, were inducted into the Rock and Roll Hall of Fame. The Van Halen brothers did not attend due to Eddie's condition. Roth was to perform with the band Velvet Revolver; however, conflict with the band caused his part to be canceled. Roth subsequently did not attend the induction, leaving only Michael Anthony and Sammy Hagar to represent Van Halen. Both Anthony and Hagar thanked Roth publicly for his contribution to the band during the awards acceptance. Roth did not attend the ceremony and the event was considered yet another public embarrassment for the band. The conflict was rumored to be based on song selection. Roth wanted to perform "Jump", the band's highest-charting song, but Velvet Revolver would only agree to play "Ain't Talkin' 'Bout Love" or "You Really Got Me". When it was finally agreed upon that Paul Shaffer would perform "Jump", Roth claimed there was no longer enough time to rehearse and opted not to attend the ceremony.

On August 13, 2007, six months after the initial reunion tour was postponed, it was finally confirmed by Van Halen with Roth at a press conference in Los Angeles that they would start the tour again in September 2007. At that conference, Eddie Van Halen stated that he and Roth were "like brothers" now. Calling Van Halen a "real band", both Van Halen and Roth spoke of the possibility of further worldwide touring and a new album in mind for the future.

On June 5, 2008, Van Halen announced that the 2007–2008 tour with Roth grossed more than $93 million, a record for the rock band. Van Halen played to nearly one million people during 74 arena shows throughout the United States and Canada, beginning September 27, 2007, in Charlotte, North Carolina, and wrapping June 3, 2008, in Quebec City, QC, for the 400th anniversary of the city.

In December 2011, Van Halen announced a 2012 tour with Roth. The new Roth-fronted Van Halen album A Different Kind of Truth was released on February 7, 2012, and a tour commenced that month.

In March 2015, a new live album was released, Tokyo Dome Live in Concert, recorded in June 2013 during the A Different Kind of Truth Tour. That same month, the band made its first foray into American television by appearing on Jimmy Kimmel Live!, announcing a new tour in the process.

Van Halen disbanded after Eddie's death from cancer on October 6, 2020.

Later years: 2016–present 
In 2014, Roth had recorded sessions with John 5 on guitar. Roth confirmed in October 2019 the album will soon be released now that he can start making "real plans" without Van Halen. In 2019 Roth announced a nine-date solo residency at the Mandalay Bay Resort and Casino House of Blues in 2020, with shows scheduled for January 8, 10 and 11 and March 18, 20, 21, 25, 27 and 28. He also went on an American tour with the band Kiss, playing 43 cities as the opening act. While Roth did complete some of the dates, the tour was postponed due to the COVID-19 global pandemic. In August 2020 KISS announced on their website that the tour would commence with Dave and his band opening on some dates. However, by August 2021, the band dropped Roth from their tour, with bassist/vocalist Gene Simmons referring to him as being "past his prime."

In October 2020, Roth paid tribute to his late bandmate Eddie Van Halen by sharing his track "Somewhere Over the Rainbow Bar and Grill," from the 2014 sessions. It was the first of five singles from the sessions released between late-2020 and early-2022.

In October 2021, Roth announced his intentions to retire from performing following a final residency set at the House of Blues Las Vegas at Mandalay Bay in Las Vegas from December 2021 to January 2022. Following the cancellation of all shows, Roth retired from performing, with a March 2020 performance in Texas with Kiss being his final performance.

Following his retirement from performing, and the five original singles, Roth proceeded to release a series of covers of Van Halen songs throughout the second half of 2022.

Personal life
Roth has never married. He dated actress Apollonia Kotero in the 1980s. In a 2013 interview, he said he had four great loves in his life, but would not name them out of respect for his privacy. He said during the 20 years of Van Halen, he "slept with every pretty girl with two legs."

In 2018, Roth and tattoo artist Ami James created INK the Original, which was a line of skincare products designed to protect tattooed skin. Roth spent more than 300 hours getting tattooed in Japan between 2013 and 2014, and noticed the body art market was expanding.  After investing more than $7,000,000 in the company, and countless hours, the business closed its doors in March 2022 for reasons not stated.

Roth maintains residences in New York City, Los Angeles and Tokyo. He is a state-licensed emergency medical technician in New York. In 2012 he said, "I probably have over 200 9-1-1 calls on my ticket in the last six years alone. I live a very different life away from music." He is a martial artist, has been training in kenjutsu since he was twelve years old, and also practices kenpō and Brazilian jiu-jitsu.

Roth is a visual artist working in painting and drawings with a theme of social commentary.

Solo band members

 Guitars Steve Vai (1986–1989)
 Bass Guitar Billy Sheehan (1986–1988)
 Percussion  Gregg Bissonette (1986–1989)

Band member timeline

Guitar
 Al Estrada - lead guitar (2019–2021)
 Jake Faun - rhythm guitar (2020)
 Frankie Lindia - rhythm guitar (2020)
 Brian Young - lead guitar (2002–2006)
 Toshi Hiketa - rhythm guitar (2003–2006)
 Bart Walsh (1999–2001) (died 2019)
 Mike Hartman (1998) (died 2000)
 John 5 (1998, 2012, 2019)
 Steve Hunter (1990–1992, 1997)
 Terry Kilgore (1993–1994)
 Rocket Ritchotte (1993–1994)
 Joe Holmes (1991–1992)
 Desi Rexx (1991, a few shows in Europe only)
 Jason Becker (1990–1991)
 Steve Vai (1985–1989)

Bass guitar
 Ryan Wheeler (2020)
 Todd Jensen (1990–1991, 1999–2000, 2004–2006)
 James LoMenzo (2001–2004)
 B'urbon Bob (1998)—pseudonym for John 5
 John Regan (1994)
 James Hunting (1993–1994)
 Matt Bissonette (1988–1990)
 Billy Sheehan (1985–1988)

Drums
 Francis Valentino (2020)
 Mike Musselman (2019–2020)
 Jimmy DeGrasso (2006)
 Ray Luzier (1997–2000, 2001–2005)
 Ron Wikso (1993–1994)
 Larry Aberman (1994)
 Joseph Hudson (1993–1994, 1995–1997)
 Gregg Bissonette (1985–1992)

Keyboard
 Danny Wagner (2020)
 Marcus Margand II (2000–2001)
 Patrick Howard I (1998–1999)
 Billy Thompson (1996–1998)
 Richard Hilton (1994–1995)
 Brett Tuggle (1988–1994, 1997)
 Jesse Harms (1986)

Discography

Studio albums
 Eat 'Em and Smile (1986)
 Skyscraper (1988)
 A Little Ain't Enough (1991)
 Your Filthy Little Mouth (1994)
 DLR Band (1998)
 Diamond Dave (2003)

Extended plays
 Crazy from the Heat (1985)

with Van Halen

 Van Halen (1978)
 Van Halen II (1979)
 Women and Children First (1980)
 Fair Warning (1981)
 Diver Down (1982)
 1984 (1984)
 A Different Kind of Truth (2012)

Books

Explanatory notes

References

Further reading

External links

 
 

 
1954 births
20th-century American male singers
20th-century American singers
21st-century American male singers
21st-century American singers
American hard rock musicians
American people of Jewish descent
American people of Portuguese descent
American radio personalities
American rock singers
Glam metal musicians
Jewish American musicians
Jewish American writers
Jewish heavy metal musicians
Jewish rock musicians
Jewish singers
Living people
Magna Carta Records artists
Musicians from Bloomington, Indiana
Musicians from Pasadena, California
Pasadena City College alumni
People from Swampscott, Massachusetts
Record producers from California
Record producers from Indiana
Record producers from Massachusetts
Singers from Indiana
Van Halen members
Writers from Bloomington, Indiana